Deer Park is a city in the U.S. state of Texas within the Houston–Sugar Land–Baytown metropolitan area. The city is located in Harris County and is situated in Southeast Texas. At the 2020 U.S. census, the population of Deer Park was 34,495.

History 

Deer Park was founded in 1892 by Simeon H. West, a farmer, retired legislator, and much-traveled adventurer from Illinois. He named the town for the large number of deer that roamed the Gulf plains. A railroad station opened later that year and a post office followed in 1893.

The subdivision was established in 1893 and was the site of a Galveston, Harrisburg and San Antonio Railway station by about 1894. A Deer Park post office was established in 1893, discontinued in 1919, and reestablished in 1930. In 1896, the community, with a population of forty, had a hotel, a general store, and three resident carpenters. By 1922, Deer Park had dwindled down to almost nothing with four houses, one little schoolhouse, and an old hotel with a few scattered shacks along the railroad right-of-way. In 1928, Shell Oil Company broke ground on a new refinery. In the 1930s, an independent school district was established. By 1940, the population had grown to 100.  By 1946, however, the area began to flourish as Deer Park became the site of refineries and toluene plants for the production of TNT.

The citizens of Deer Park voted to incorporate on December 12, 1948, and a few weeks later Earl E. Dunn became the first mayor.
Because of the 1948 incorporation, Houston did not incorporate Deer Park's territory into its city limits. The first city council meeting was held on February 7, 1949. The population had grown to 700 by 1948, to 5,000 by 1960 with a fire station, city hall, playground parks and an independent city water supply. A public library was begun in 1962. Population was 12,773 in 1970, and 28,520 in 2000. This growth has been fueled by the growth of the petrochemical industry as well as the growth of business along the Houston Ship Channel. Deer Park has a school district with 14 campuses, a city library, community theater, municipal court building, three fire stations, numerous city parks and recreational facilities, state-of-the-art water and sewer processing facilities, a post office, several hotels, 14 major industries as well as several light industrial companies. Today, Deer Park has approximately 9,000 homes and more than 30,000 residents.

Deer Park is near the site of the Battle of San Jacinto, where, on April 21, 1836, Texas won its independence from Mexico. Because the initial surrender treaty after the battle was drafted in Dr. George Moffitt Patrick's cabin, Deer Park bills itself as the "Birthplace of Texas". The original cabin was located on Buffalo Bayou where Rohm and Haas, now owned by Dow Chemical Company, established a chemical plant in Deer Park. A replica of Dr. Patrick's cabin is in front of the Theatre/Courts Building on Center Street. The Texas State Historical sign marker was relocated from the Dow Chemical parking lot to the replica log cabin home of Dr. Patrick located at the Theatre/Courts Building.

Shell Chemical plant explosion 
While no evacuation of the city was ordered, residents living within a mile west of the plant were advised to remain inside their homes.

Intercontinental Terminals Company's chemical fire 
On March 17, 2019, a huge chemical fire broke out in the chemical tank farm at Intercontinental Terminals Company. The fire, which was caused by a leak in one tank, eventually spread to a dozen tanks. The leak was caused by a failure of manifold power frame of the tank.
The resultant fire and smoke flume could be seen for miles and lasted for three days. The tanks involved in the fire contained chemicals including xylene, naptha, pyrolysis gasoline (Pygas), and toluene.  Deer Park residents were required to shelter in place during the fire.

January 24, 2023 tornado 
Deer Park has been known for several smaller and less destructive tornadoes in its past, but on January 24, 2023, a large EF3 tornado hit downtown Deer Park. It caused damage most notably to a nursing home and an animal shelter, brought down cell service for the city, and knocked out power to many areas, including schools in the Deer Park Independent School District. Schools were still in session at the time of the tornado, but no students or teachers in the affected schools were injured or killed. Entire neighborhoods were severely damaged as a result of the tornado. The tornado prompted the first ever tornado emergency issued by the National Weather Service in League City.

Geography 

Deer Park is located in southeastern Harris County at  (29.692003, –95.118108).

Deer Park is bounded by the city of Pasadena to the south and west, by the city of La Porte to the south and east, and by the Houston Ship Channel—the dredged-out Buffalo Bayou—to the north.

Demographics 

As of the 2020 United States census, there were 34,495 people, 11,637 households, and 8,813 families residing in the city. The American Community Survey reported a population of 33,474 in 2019.

According to the 2019 American Community Survey, the racial and ethnic makeup of the city was 57.5% non-Hispanic white, 1.8% Black and African American, 1.4% American Indian and Alaska Native, 1.6% Asian, 3.2% multiracial, and 37.8% Hispanic and Latin American of any race. In 2000, the racial makeup of the city was 90.01% White, 1.31% African American, 0.41% Native American, 1.13% Asian, 0.13% Pacific Islander, 5.25% from other races, and 1.76% from two or more races. Hispanic or Latino of any race were 15.22% of the population.

In 2000, the median income for a household in the city was $61,334, and the median income for a family was $66,516. Males had a median income of $50,867 versus $30,926 for females. The per capita income for the city was $24,440. About 4.0% of families and 5.6% of the population were below the poverty line, including 5.4% of those under age 18 and 4.9% of those age 65 or over. By 2019, residents of Deer Park had a median gross rent of $1,170 in 2019 and median household income of $80,592. The per capita income was $33,083 and 7.3% of the population lived at or below the poverty line.

Government 
The Deer Park Post Office is located at 200 East San Augustine Street.

Deer Park closed the old city hall and built a new building next door on a vacant lot. The doors to the new city hall was opened in 2018. The old building was torn down and parking lot enlarged. The building is located at 710 E. San Augustine Street.

The Harris Health System (formerly Harris County Hospital District) designated the Strawberry Health Center in Pasadena for the ZIP code 77536. The designated public hospital is Ben Taub General Hospital in the Texas Medical Center.

Electoral districts 
United States Congressional District
 Texas 36th congressional district
US Representative Brian Babin (R)

Texas State Senate Districts
 Texas Senate District 11
Texas Senator Larry Taylor (R)
 Senate District 6
Texas Senator Sylvia Garcia (D)

Texas State House Districts
 Texas House District 144
Representative Mary Ann Perez (D)

 Texas House District 128
Representative Briscoe Cain (R)

Education

Primary and secondary education

Public schools 
Most Deer Park pupils attend schools in Deer Park Independent School District. Some attend school in the La Porte Independent School District.

Deer Park High School serves the DPISD portion.
La Porte High School serves the LPISD portion. Deer Park has 4 junior high schools, Deer Park Junior High, Bonnette Junior High, Fairmont Junior High and Deepwater Junior High. There are 7 elementary schools that serve the area as well. Deer Park ISD has an open enrollment program that allows students that do not reside within the boundaries of DPISD to attend DPISD Schools.  LPISD has two elementary schools in Deer Park: College Park Elementary and Heritage Elementary. The 10,000-capacity Clyde Abshier Stadium is the home of the Deer Park Deer.

Colleges

Deer Park is also served by the San Jacinto College District, Central Campus.

Public libraries 
The city operates the Deer Park Library at 3009 Center Street.

Notable people
Briscoe Cain,  member of the Texas House of Representatives
Zane Gonzalez, NFL kicker 
Charles Holcomb, judge of the Texas Court of Criminal Appeals
Andy Pettitte, MLB pitcher for Houston Astros
Chelsi Smith, Miss Texas USA 1995, Miss USA 1995 and Miss Universe 1995

References

External links 

City of Deer Park official website

Cities in Texas
Greater Houston
Cities in Harris County, Texas
History of Texas